Ascalenia echidnias is a moth in the family Cosmopterigidae. It is found on Madeira, Sardinia and Malta and from North Africa to Asia Minor and Iran. The habitat consists of dry or desert-like areas.

Adults have been recorded from April to June and from September to October.

References

Moths described in 1891
Ascalenia
Moths of Europe
Moths of Asia
Moths of Africa